Cooch Behar Government Engineering College is a government engineering college in Cooch Behar district, West Bengal, India. It is approved by the All India Council for Technical Education and affiliated to Maulana Abul Kalam Azad University of Technology. The college is approved by AICTE and Maulana Abul Kalam Azad University of Technology, West Bengal (Formerly known as West Bengal University of Technology) – MAKAUT/WBUT and Government of India and the Department of Higher Education, Government of West Bengal. The institute is located at its own campus of 21 acres.

Courses offered 

Cooch Behar Government Engineering College offers Undergraduate courses (Bachelor of Technology) in the following courses:
 B.Tech in Computer Science and Engineering 
B.Tech in Electronics and Telecommunication Engineering 
B.Tech in Electrical Engineering 
B.Tech in Mechanical Engineering 
B.Tech in Civil Engineering 

It is affiliated to Maulana Abul Kalam Azad University of Technology.

References

CGEC Prospectus 2019-20 (pdf). Cooch Behar Government Engineering College. 2019.
CGEC Brochure 2021 (pdf). Cooch Behar Government Engineering College. 2021.

Engineering colleges in West Bengal
Universities and colleges in Cooch Behar district
Colleges affiliated to West Bengal University of Technology
Educational institutions established in 2016
2016 establishments in West Bengal
Cooch Behar
{
  "type": "FeatureCollection",
  "features": [
    {
      "type": "Feature",
      "properties": {},
      "geometry": {
        "type": "Point",
        "coordinates": [
          89.4601035111555,
          26.292878354041715
        ]
      }
    }
  ]
}